Kenneth William Allen (17 November 1923 – 2 May 1997) was Professor of Nuclear Physics at the University of Oxford, England. The Independent stated that "Allen will be best remembered for his outstanding contributions to nuclear structure physics and for his advocacy of the use of electrostatic nuclear accelerators in other areas of science. Accelerators – otherwise known as "atom smashers" – are machines used for studying nuclear reactions by creating beams of high-energy particles."

Kenneth Allen was educated at: Ilford County High School; University of London (Drapers' Scholar); St Catharine's College, Cambridge (PhD (Cantab) 1947).

Career
 Physics Division, Atomic Energy of Canada, Chalk River, 1947–1951
 Leverhulme Research Fellow and Lecturer, Liverpool University, 1951–1954
 Deputy Chief Scientist, United Kingdom Atomic Energy Authority, 1954–1963
 Professor of Nuclear Structure, 1963–1991, Professor Emeritus, from 1991, and Head of Department of Nuclear Physics, 1976–1979 and 1982–1985, University of Oxford

Other offices held
 Fellow, 1963–1992, Emeritus Fellow, from 1992, Balliol College, Oxford (Estates Bursar, 1980–1983 and 1991–1993)
 Senior Visiting Scientist, Lawrence Berkeley Laboratory, University of California, 1988-9
 Member, Nuclear Physics Board, Science Research Council, 1970–1973

References

External links 

 Kenneth William Allen archival papers held at the University of Toronto Archives and Records Management Services

1923 births
1997 deaths
English physicists
English nuclear physicists
People educated at Ilford County High School
Fellows of Balliol College, Oxford
Alumni of the University of London
Alumni of St Catharine's College, Cambridge
Academics of the University of Liverpool
Accelerator physicists